The Boston College Eagles baseball team represents Boston College in NCAA Division I college baseball. The team participates in the Atlantic Division of the Atlantic Coast Conference. The head coach of the Eagles is Mike Gambino, a 2000 alumnus of Boston College, and the team plays its home games at the newly constructed Eddie Pellagrini Diamond at Harrington Athletics Village after having played at Shea Field from 1961 to 2017.

NCAA Division I tournament
The team has been selected to play in the NCAA Division I baseball tournament eight times, most recently in 2016. It has played in the College World Series four times, the most recent being 1967.

Conference tournament

Longest game in college-baseball history

On May 30, 2009, the Eagles played in the longest game in college-baseball history — a 25-inning game — during the NCAA Division I Baseball Championship regional tournament at Austin, Texas. The University of Texas Longhorns — who were designated the visiting team despite playing on their home field — won, 3–2. The game lasted seven hours and three minutes.

Exhibition game with Boston Red Sox
The team has traditionally played an exhibition game each spring against the Boston Red Sox, as part of the Red Sox' spring training (Grapefruit League) season at JetBlue Park at Fenway South.

Annual ALS Awareness Game
This game began in 2012 and is played in honor of former captain Pete Frates (2004–2007), who was diagnosed with ALS in 2012.

See also
List of NCAA Division I baseball programs

References

External links